"Remember the Monsters?" is the 12th and final episode of the eighth season and the series finale  of the Showtime television series Dexter. The episode, which originally aired on September 22, 2013, was written by Scott Buck and Manny Coto, and directed by Steve Shill. The episode served as the series finale of the show's original run, although Dexter returned as a limited series in November 2021, titled Dexter: New Blood.

Plot
Dexter Morgan (Michael C. Hall) arrives at the airport with his son Harrison (Jadon Wells) to leave for Argentina with Hannah McKay (Yvonne Strahovski), who is hiding in the women's bathroom from private detective Jacob Elway (Sean Patrick Flanery). Dexter fills up a backpack with miscellaneous items, places it under a waiting room seat, and tells the flight booker that he saw Elway leave a suspicious backpack under a seat and walk away. She calls airport security, who detain Elway, allowing enough time for Dexter, Harrison, and Hannah to escape. However, they are unable to board the plane, because Dexter's contrived security threat shuts down the terminal.

Debra Morgan (Jennifer Carpenter), shot by serial killer Oliver Saxon (Darri Ingolfsson), is rushed by ambulance to the hospital accompanied by Joey Quinn (Desmond Harrington). She tells Joey she had thought she was going to die and that she would have deserved it. Quinn reassures Deb that she is a good person, and that he believes the good one puts out into the world cancels out the bad. He tells her she will have many opportunities to do good things now that she is a detective again. As they arrive at the hospital and Debra is rushed into emergency surgery, she finally tells a startled Quinn that she loves him.

Against Debra's wishes, Thomas Matthews (Geoff Pierson) calls Dexter to inform him that Debra has been shot.  Meanwhile, all flights are grounded due to the oncoming Hurricane Laura, and boats are being moored or put in drydock, thus stranding Dexter, Hannah, and Harrison in Miami. Dexter leaves Harrison with Hannah at a hotel and then goes to see Debra. At the hospital, the doctor (Amy Pietz) informs Dexter that she is optimistic Debra will recover. Debra tells Dexter to go live a happy life, free of guilt.

Meanwhile, Saxon makes his way to the hospital. Dexter confronts him, but before anything can happen, Angel Batista (David Zayas) puts Saxon under arrest. Dexter goes into Debra's room and finds it empty. A shaken Quinn informs Dexter that Deb's condition has worsened. The doctor advises that a blood clot during surgery caused Debra to suffer a stroke, leaving her in a persistent vegetative state. Dexter blames himself and realizes that he destroys everyone he loves, and can never have a happy life.

Hannah and Harrison, meanwhile, sit in a bus heading for Jacksonville. Suddenly, Elway seizes Hannah's arm, telling her that he will turn her in to the Marshal's office at Daytona, the next bus stop. Hannah manages to inject Elway in the thigh with one of Dexter's tranquilizers and escapes with Harrison.

Dexter arrives at the jail and tells the desk clerk he is there to collect GSR from Saxon. Dexter tells Saxon that he is there to kill him with the ballpoint pen he places on the table between them. Seizing the opportunity to kill Dexter, Saxon grabs the pen and slams it into Dexter's left shoulder. Dexter pulls the pen out and plunges it into Saxon's jugular vein, killing him. Dexter claims self-defense, which Batista and Quinn appear to accept, although it is suggested that they know what really happened.

Dexter drives his boat, the Slice of Life, to the hospital. He disconnects Debra's life support systems and, seconds before she dies, whispers "I love you" into her ear. He then places her body on a gurney and, in the chaos of the evacuation, manages to slip unseen with the body onto his boat, docked in the rear of the hospital. Dexter calls a happy Hannah, just as she and Harrison are boarding their flight. Dexter tells Harrison and Hannah he loves them, and then tosses his phone overboard. Dexter then somberly drops Debra's body into the ocean and then drives the boat into the coming storm.

After the storm, Batista receives a call from the Coast Guard, who tell him they have discovered the shattered remnants of Dexter's boat in the ocean and no apparent survivors. The police and media conclude that Dexter died in the wreck. At a cafe in Argentina, Hannah reads an internet article reporting Dexter's supposed death. She silently fights back tears, then puts on a smile and takes Harrison to get some ice cream.

The series’ final scene reveals that Dexter is still alive and living under an assumed identity, working for a lumber company in Astoria, Oregon. He comes home from work to a small, wood-framed house, and sits in the living room, alone, glaring at the camera.

Reception
When it premiered, "Remember the Monsters?" was watched by 2.8 million household viewers, beating the previous season's finale, "Surprise Motherfucker!", for the most-watched original episode in the series and in Showtime history. Including its repeat airing the same day, a later count revealed the episode reached 3.3 million viewers, breaking the season opener episode, "A Beautiful Day", for the biggest broadcast of all airings in Showtime history.

Although the episode's viewership broke records, the critical response to the series finale was mixed and deeply polarized. Mary McNamara of the Los Angeles Times praised Carpenter's performance as worthy of an Emmy nomination and argued that "the parting scenes between Dexter and Deb, possibly the most powerful sibling bond television has ever seen, gave the show the send-off it deserved". Mike Hale of The New York Times called it one of the "saddest endings you'll ever see on a primetime tv show", stated that he "bought the ending", and observed that fans "may or may not think that Dexter’s final resting place is the one he deserves. But it works". James Hibberd of Entertainment Weekly championed the series finale as "the best Dexter episode in years. ... It was also one of the strangest episodes in the show's history ... It's like watching a different series, one that was more compelling than the show it served to close."

Other responses to the finale were more negative. Joshua Alston of The A.V. Club gave the episode an F and argued that the writers botched "the landing" by choosing ambiguity to avoid the conflict of "whether or not [fans] wanted Dexter to get away with it". Frazier Moore of the Associated Press called the ending sappy, sloppy, and a "cop-out". Richard Lawson of the Atlantic Monthly described the finale as an "unbelievably unsatisfying end [which] ruins all that came before it".

Showtime president David Nevins praised the series finale against fan backlash, saying: "The fundamental design of where they ended Dexter was really well-conceived. He had to sacrifice the one person who was closest to him in the world, and he had to leave. That was where it was headed for a very long time." Nevins also said there were never any discussions to kill off Dexter, and they did not just keep the character alive for a potential spinoff series.

References

External links
 "Remember the Monsters?" on Showtime
 

Dexter (TV series) episodes
2013 American television episodes
American television series finales
Sororicide in fiction